Anthony W. Genatempo is a United States Air Force major general who serves as the director of the C3I Networks Directorate at the Air Force Life Cycle Management Center. He previously commanded the Air Force Nuclear Weapons Center from 2020 to 2022.

References

External links

Year of birth missing (living people)
Living people
Place of birth missing (living people)
United States Air Force generals